Legionella tunisiensis is a Gram-negative bacterium from the genus Legionella isolated from hypersaline lake water from the Lake Sabkha in Tunisia.

References

External links
Type strain of Legionella tunisiensis at BacDive -  the Bacterial Diversity Metadatabase

Legionellales
Bacteria described in 2012